Savi Sidhu is an Indian actor, who worked in Bollywood films. He appeared in numerous Hindi films including Black Friday (2007), Gulaal (2009), Patiala House (2011) and Bewakoofiyaan (2014).

In March 2019, he was reported to be working as a security guard in Mumbai, due to a financial crisis.

Career 
Sidhu did his first film when Anurag Kashyap cast him in Paanch, a film which was never released. He starred in Anurag Kashyap's 2004 film Black Friday, where he played the role of Commissioner A.S. Samra.

He appeared in Gulaal, also directed by Anurag Kashyap, and then in Patiala House, directed by Nikkhil Advani.

Filmography 
 2020 - ‘’Maska’’ as Hasan
 2014 - Bewakoofiyaan as Masterji
 2013 - Arrambam as Terrorist (Durrane's boss)
 2013 - Jal as Mukhiya
 2013 - D-Day as K.S. Lodhi
 2013 - Nautanki Saala! as Raja Janak
 2011 - Patiala House
 2009 - Blue Oranges as Mahadev 
 2009 - Gulaal as Dileep's Elder Brother
 2005 - Khamoshh... Khauff Ki Raat as Ex-husband (as Savi Siddhu)
 2004 - Black Friday as A.S. Samra
 2003 - Zameen 
 2003 - Escape from Taliban as Rammajan
 2000 - Aaja Mere Raja 
 1995 - Taaqat (as Savi Siddhu)

Television 
 2008-2009 - Equador (TV Mini-Series) as Raja Singh
 Rishtey (TV series), ep. 16, Mehmaan
 2004 - Raat Hone Ko Hai, Story # 23: Makaya

References

External links

Indian male film actors
Year of birth missing
Indian male television actors
Male actors in Hindi cinema
20th-century Indian male actors
Male actors from Mumbai
21st-century Indian male actors
Male actors in Hindi television